The 1974–75 season was Nottingham Forest's 110th year in existence and third campaign consecutive in the Second Division since their relegation in 1972.

Summary

During summer the club reinforced the side transferred in several players, left back Paddy Greenwood from Boston Minutemen, Welsh defender Dave Jones from AFC Bournemouth and forward Barry Butlin from Luton Town F.C. From the youth squad arrived goalkeeper John Middleton and defender Viv Anderson for the right back position. After a bad streak of results, included an early elimination in League Cup on 6 January 1975 the board sacked Allan Brown and appointed former Derby County 1972 League Champion manager Brian Clough. Also, Jimmy Gordon arrived as club trainer as the Scottishman had been for Clough at Derby County and Leeds United. The two made their debut in League winning at Fulham bringing with him two players from his 44-day failed tenure in Leeds United: midfielder John McGovern and forward John O'Hare. However, the team plummeted 11 successive matches without a win. The squad reached two games won in the last five rounds to avoid relegation to Third Division.

Meanwhile, in FA Cup the team in Third round, now with Clough, defeated Tottenham Hotspur and advanced to the fourth round being eliminated by Fulham F.C. after three replay matches.

Squad

Transfers

Statistics

Players statistics

The statistics for the following players are for their time during 1974–75 season playing for Nottingham Forest. Any stats from a different club during 1974–75 are not included. Includes all competitive matches.

Table

Results by round

Matches

A list of Nottingham Forest's matches in the 1974–75 season.

Competitive

Second Division

League Cup

FA Cup

Third round

Replay

Fourth round

Replay

Second replay

Third replay

References

Nottingham Forest F.C. seasons
Nottingham Forest